
The following is a list of Playboy Playmates of 1956.  Playboy magazine names its Playmate of the Month each month throughout the year.

January

Lynn Turner (born December 1, 1935) was an American model. She was Playboy magazine's Playmate of the Month for the January 1956 issue. Her centerfold was photographed by Peter Gowland, the first of his extensive Playboy career. According to The Playmate Book, Turner did layouts for other men's magazines, including Frolic, Jest and Modern Man Quarterly.

February

Marguerite Empey (July 29, 1932 – August 19, 2008) was an American model, dancer and actress. She was Playboy magazine's Playmate of the Month in May 1955 and February 1956. The photos for her 1956 appearance were taken by soft core porn director Russ Meyer.

March

Marian Stafford (February 7, 1931 – August 16, 1984) was an American actress and model. She was Playboy magazine's Playmate of the Month for the March 1956 issue. Her centerfold was photographed by Ruth Sondak, and was the first to fold out to three pages. (Prior to this, the centerfolds covered two pages.)

April

Rusty Fisher (born April 5, 1935) was an American model. She was Playboy magazine's Playmate of the Month for the April 1956 issue. Her centerfold was photographed by Sam Wu. Prior to her Playboy appearance, she had posed for several other men's magazines, often under other pseudonyms such as Rusty Williams and Donna Fisher.

May

Marion Scott, a German-born American model, was Playboy magazine's Playmate of the Month for the May 1956 issue. Her centerfold was photographed by Herman Leonard. She was the first foreign-born Playmate.

According to The Playmate Book, Scott emigrated to the U.S. along with her parents after World War II ended, and eventually became a fashion model, as well as a frequent cover girl for detective magazines.

June

Gloria Walker (born July 16, 1937) was an American actress and model. She was Playboy magazine's Playmate of the Month for the June 1956 issue.

July

Alice Denham  (January 21, 1927 – January 27, 2016) was an American model, author, and former adjunct professor of English at City University of New York. She is the author of the novels Amo: The feminist centrefold from outer space (1974) and My Darling from the Lions (1968), and the short story collection Secrets of San Miguel (2013), as well as the novelisations Adios, Sabata (1971) and The Ghost and Mrs. Muir (1968). She has also published a memoir, Sleeping with Bad Boys (2006), about her time among the New York circle of writers in the fifties and sixties. She was the subject of a musical composition by Fluxus artist Al Hansen; "Alice Denham In 48 Seconds".

She was Playboy magazine's Playmate of the Month for the July 1956 issue.  Her centerfold was credited to Arthur-James and Mike Shea. She died of complications from ovarian cancer on January 27, 2016.

August

Jonnie Nicely (February 25, 1936 – February 6, 2013) was an American model. She was Playboy magazine's Playmate of the Month for the August 1956 issue. Her centerfold was photographed by Hal Adams.

Nicely was originally supposed to be a Playmate for the October 1955 issue, but scheduling and creative conflicts temporarily pushed her aside in favor of Jean Moorhead. Before and after her Playboy appearance, Nicely did additional pin-up modeling, but eventually she went on to a long career as a mechanic at a Rockwell International B-1 bomber plant in California.

September

Elsa Sørensen (March 25, 1934 – April 18, 2013) was a Danish model, and Miss Denmark, who did most of her work under the pseudonym Dane Arden. Under her real name, she was Playboy magazine's Playmate of the Month for the September 1956 issue.

Her centerfold was photographed by Peter Gowland. She was first married to Guy Mitchell but that marriage ended in divorce.  She survived her second husband Philip Mattingly.

October

Janet Pilgrim (June 13, 1934 – May 1, 2017) was an American model and office worker for Playboy. She was chosen as Playboy's Playmate of the Month three times: July 1955,  December 1955 and  October 1956.

November

Betty Blue (August 14, 1931 – August 23, 2000) was an American model and actress, and was Playboy magazine's Playmate of the Month for the November 1956 issue. Her centerfold was photographed by Hal Adams.

December

Lisa Winters (born March 6, 1937) is an American model and actress.  She is Playboy magazine's Playmate of the Month for its December 1956 issue and later named as the magazine's first Playmate of the Year for 1957. She also worked as a secretary for Hugh Hefner in Chicago's Playboy offices. She starred in two films; her first film was with her Playboy photographer Bunny Yeager, and named Bunny Yeager's Nude Camera (1963); her second film, in which she starred under her real name, Marie Perry, was named Intimate Diary of Artists' Models. Both films are rated R for nudity.

See also
 List of people in Playboy 1953–59

References

1956-related lists
Playmates Of 1956